Nuance Communications, Inc. is an American multinational computer software technology corporation, headquartered in Burlington, Massachusetts, that markets speech recognition and artificial intelligence software.

Nuance merged with its competitor in the commercial large-scale speech application business, ScanSoft, in October 2005. ScanSoft was a Xerox spin-off that was bought in 1999 by Visioneer, a hardware and software scanner company, which adopted ScanSoft as the new merged company name. The original ScanSoft had its roots in Kurzweil Computer Products.

In April 2021, Microsoft announced it would buy Nuance Communications. The deal is an all-cash transaction of $19.7 billion, including company debt, or $56 per share. The acquisition was completed in March 2022.

History
The company that would become Nuance was incorporated in 1992 as Visioneer. In 1999, Visioneer acquired ScanSoft, Inc. (SSFT), and the combined company became known as ScanSoft. In September 2005, ScanSoft Inc. acquired and merged with Nuance Communications, a natural language spinoff from SRI International. The resulting company adopted the Nuance name. During the prior decade, the two companies competed in the commercial large-scale speech application business.

ScanSoft origins 
In 1974, Raymond Kurzweil founded Kurzweil Computer Products, Inc. to develop the first omni-font optical character-recognition systema computer program capable of recognizing text written in any normal font. In 1980, Kurzweil sold his company to Xerox. The company became known as Xerox Imaging Systems (XIS), and later ScanSoft.

In March 1992, a new company called Visioneer, Inc. was founded to develop scanner hardware and software products, such as a sheetfed scanner called PaperMax and the document management software PaperPort. Visioneer eventually sold its hardware division to Primax Electronics, Ltd. in January 1999. Two months later, in March, Visioneer acquired ScanSoft from Xerox to form a new public company with ScanSoft as the new company-wide name.

Prior to 2001, ScanSoft focused primarily on desktop imaging software such as TextBridge, PaperPort and OmniPage. Beginning with the December 2001 acquisition of Lernout & Hauspie assets, the company moved into the speech recognition business and began to compete with Nuance. Lernout & Hauspie had acquired speech recognition company Dragon Systems in June 2001, shortly before becoming bankrupt in October.

Partnership with Siri and Apple Inc. 
In 2013, Nuance confirmed that its natural language processing algorithms supported Apple's Siri voice assistant.

Acquisition by Microsoft 
On April 12, 2021, Microsoft announced that it will buy Nuance Communications for $19.7 billion, or $56 a share, a 22% increase over the previous closing price. Nuance's CEO, Mark Benjamin, will stay with the company. This will be Microsoft's second-biggest deal ever, after its purchase of LinkedIn for $24 billion in 2016. Shortly after the deal, the Competition and Markets Authority, a UK regulatory body, stated it was looking into the deal on the basis of antitrust concerns. In December 2021, it was reported that the deal would be approved by the European Union. The acquisition was completed on March 4, 2022.

References

External links
 

Software companies based in Massachusetts
Companies formerly listed on the Nasdaq
American companies established in 1992
Software companies established in 1992
1992 establishments in Massachusetts
Companies based in Burlington, Massachusetts

Speaker recognition
2000 initial public offerings
Software companies of the United States
2022 mergers and acquisitions
Microsoft acquisitions
Microsoft subsidiaries